Pikromycin was studied by Brokmann and Hekel in 1951 and was the first antibiotic macrolide to be isolated.
Pikromycin is synthesized through a type I polyketide synthase system in Streptomyces venezuelae, a species of Gram-positive bacterium in the genus Streptomyces.
Pikromycin is derived from narbonolide, a 14-membered ring macrolide.

Along with the narbonolide backbone, pikromycin includes a desosamine sugar and a hydroxyl group.  Although Pikromycin is not a clinically useful antibiotic, it can be used as a raw material to synthesize antibiotic ketolide compounds such as ertythromycins and new epothilones.



Biosynthesis 

The pikromycin polyketide synthase of Streptomyces venezuelae contains four polypeptides: PikAI, PikAII, PikAIII, and PikAIV. These polypeptides contain a loading module, six extension molecules, and a thioesterase domain that terminated the biosynthetic procedure.

Recently electron cryo-microscopy have been used to determine sub-nanometre-resolution three- dimensional reconstructions of a full-length PKS module from the bacterium Streptomyces venezuelae that revealed an unexpectedly different architecture.

In Figure 1, each circle corresponds to a PKS mutilifuctional protein, where ACP is acyl carrier protein, KS is keto-ACP synthase, KSQ is a keto-ACP synthase like domain, AT is acyltransferase, KR is keto ACP reductase, KR with cross is inactive KR, DH is hydroxyl-thioester dehydratase, ER is enoyl reductase, TEI is thioesterase domain I, TEII is type II thioesterase. 

Des corresponds to the enzymes utilized in desosamine biosynthesis and transfer, which include DesI-DesVIII.

Figure 2 represents the desosamine deoxyamino sugar biosynthetic pathway. DesI-DesVI (des locus of pikromycin PKS) encodes all the enzymes needed to obtain TDP-desoamine from TDP-glucose. DesVII and DesVIII activities transfer desoamine to narbonolide and narbomycin is obtained. PikC cytochrome P450 hydrolase catalyzes the hydroxylation of narbomycin to obtain pikromycin.

See also
 Polyketide synthase

References

Macrolide antibiotics